Tyler Baker may refer to:

People
Tyler Christopher (actor) (born Tyler Christopher Baker, 1972), American actor
Tyler Baker (baseball), American baseball player for Sydney Blue Sox
Tyler A. Baker III on List of law clerks of the Supreme Court of the United States (Seat 4)

Fictional characters
Tyler Baker, Sherman Oaks character played by Jason Behr